The family name Keats is a surname of England.

Etymology
The surname Keats is believed to have originated with the Anglo Saxon culture, perhaps from the old English word cyta or cyte, a worker at the shed, or an outhouse for animals, hence herdsman. It can also be attributed to the Middle English word kete or kyte (the bird) from greed or rapacity.

The family name Keats emerged as a notable family name in the county of Devonshire, where they were recorded as a family of great antiquity seated at Kitts, and they were the lords of the manor and of now extinct baronets. They also branched into Berkshire and Gloucestershire.  The Keats coat of arms is a silver shield overlaid with three dark silver mountain cats beneath an Armet and embroidered with vines and leaves of alternating colours of red and silver.

As of the 1891 census in England, most Keats's or Keates's were resident in Staffordshire. Members of the family name Keats made their way to the New World, settling in such places as Newfoundland, Maryland, Boston, Philadelphia, and Anchorage.

People with the surname
Notable individuals bearing the surname include:

 Abigail Keats (born 1986), South African fashion designer
 Charles B. Keats (1905–1978), American politician and journalist
 Duke Keats (1895–1972), Canadian Hall-of-Fame ice hockey player
 Ed Keats (1915–2019), United States Navy rear admiral
 Ele Keats (born 1973), American actress
 George Keats (1797–1841), British-born American businessman and civic leader, brother of John Keats
 John Keats (1795–1821), English poet
 John Keats (writer) (1921–2000), American magazine writer, author and biographer
 Jonathon Keats (born 1971), American conceptual artist and experimental philosopher
 Jonathan Keates (born 1946),  English writer, biographer and novelist
 Richard Goodwin Keats (1757–1834), British Royal Navy admiral and Commodore-Governor of Newfoundland
 Roger A. Keats (born 1948), American businessman and politician
 Tyson Keats (born 1981), New Zealand rugby union player
 Steven Keats (1945–1994), American actor
 Viola Keats (1911–1998), British actress

See also 
 Anglo-Saxon names
 List of Old English (Anglo-Saxon) surnames

References

External links 
 Keats Coat of Arms
 Irish / English crest